Weng Li-you (born 9 May 1975), known as Only You, is a Taiwanese Hokkien pop singer.

Weng is known as Only You and began singing in 1998. He won the Best Taiwanese Male Singer award at the 20th Golden Melody Awards. Many of Weng's compositions have been used as theme songs for Taiwanese dramas.

References

1975 births
Living people
Taiwanese singer-songwriters
Taiwanese Hokkien pop singers
Taiwanese Buddhists
People from Changhua County
20th-century Taiwanese male  singers
21st-century Taiwanese male  singers